Nazi concentration camp badges, primarily triangles, were part of the system of identification in German camps. They were used in the concentration camps in the German-occupied countries to identify the reason the prisoners had been placed there. The triangles were made of fabric and were sewn on jackets and trousers of the prisoners. These mandatory badges of shame had specific meanings indicated by their colour and shape. Such emblems helped guards assign tasks to the detainees. For example, a guard at a glance could see if someone was a convicted criminal (green patch) and thus likely of a tough temperament suitable for kapo duty.

Someone with an escape suspect mark usually would not be assigned to work squads operating outside the camp fence. Someone wearing an F could be called upon to help translate guards' spoken instructions to a trainload of new arrivals from France. Some historical monuments quote the badge-imagery, with the use of a triangle being a sort of visual shorthand to symbolize all camp victims.

The modern-day use of a pink triangle emblem to symbolize gay rights is a response to the camp identification patches.

Badge coding system 

The system of badges varied between the camps and in the later stages of World War II the use of badges dwindled in some camps and became increasingly accidental in others. The following description is based on the badge coding system used before and during the early stages of the war in the Dachau concentration camp, which had one of the more elaborate coding systems.

Shape was chosen by analogy with the common triangular road hazard signs in Germany that denote warnings to motorists. Here, a triangle is called inverted because its base is up while one of its angles points down.

Single triangles 
 Red triangle – political prisoners: social democrats, liberals, socialists, communists, anarchists, gentiles who assisted Jews; trade unionists and Freemasons.
 Green triangle – convicts and criminals (often working as kapos).
 Blue triangle – foreign forced laborers and emigrants. This category included apatrides, Spanish refugees from Francoist Spain, whose citizenship was revoked and emigrants to countries which were occupied by Nazi Germany or were under German sphere of influence.
 Purple triangle – primarily Jehovah's Witnesses (over 99%) as well as members of other small pacifist religious groups.
 Pink triangle – primarily homosexual men and those identified as such at the time (e.g., bisexual men, trans women) and sexual offenders as well as pedophiles and zoophiles. Many in this group were subject to forced sterilization.
 Black triangle – people who were deemed asocial elements and work-shy, including the following:
 Roma and Sinti. Roma were later assigned a brown triangle.
 Mentally ill and "mentally disabled". Their triangles were additionally inscribed with the word , meaning stupid. This category included, notably, autistic people among this group. Though many others including schizophrenic and epileptic people were forcibly sterilized, shot, or gassed in psychiatric institutions as opposed to at the Nazi camps.
 Alcoholics and drug addicts.
 Vagrants and beggars.
 Pacifists and conscription resisters.
 Prostitutes.
 Lesbians.
Other disabled people, such as people with diabetes (as "Diabetes was conceptualized as a Jewish disease not necessarily because its prevalence was high among this population, but because medicine, science, and culture reinforced each other"). 
 Brown triangle – Assigned to Roma later on in the Porajmos.
 Uninverted red triangle – an enemy POW (meaning special detainee), a spy or traitor (meaning activities detainee), or a military deserter or criminal (meaning service member).

Double triangles 

Double-triangle badges resembled two superimposed triangles forming a Star of David, a Jewish symbol.
 Red inverted triangle superimposed upon a yellow one representing a Jewish political prisoner.
 Blue inverted triangle superimposed upon a red one representing foreign forced labour and political prisoner (for example, Spanish Republicans in Mauthausen).
 Green inverted triangle superimposed upon a yellow one representing a Jewish habitual criminal.
 Purple inverted triangle superimposed upon a yellow one representing a Jehovah's Witness of Jewish descent.
 Pink inverted triangle superimposed upon a yellow one representing a Jewish "sexual offender", typically a gay or bisexual man or trans woman.
 Black inverted triangle superimposed upon a yellow one representing a "asocial" or work-shy Jew.
Like those who wore pink and green triangles, people in the bottom two categories would have been convicted in criminal courts.

Distinguishing marks 
In addition to color-coding, non-German prisoners were marked by the first letter of the German name for their home country or ethnic group. Red triangle with a letter, for example:

 B (Belgians)
 E ("English"; in practice used for all British)
 F (French)
 I (Italians)
 J (Yugoslavs)
 N  (Dutch)
 No (Norwegian)
 P (Poles)
 S (Republican Spanish)
 T (Czechs)
 U (Hungarians)
 Z notation next to a black triangle (Gypsy).

Polish emigrant laborers originally wore a purple diamond with a yellow backing. A letter P (for ) was cut out of the purple cloth to show the yellow backing beneath.

Furthermore, repeat offenders (meaning recidivists) would receive bars over their stars or triangles, a different colour for a different crime.
 A political prisoner would have a red bar over their star or triangle.
 A professional criminal would have a green bar.
 A foreign forced laborer would not have a blue bar (as their impressment was for the duration of the war), but might have a different coloured bar if they were drawn from another pool of inmates.
 A Jehovah's Witness would have a purple bar.
 A homosexual or sex offender would have a pink bar.
 An asocial would have a black bar.
 Roma and Sinti would usually be incarcerated in special sub-camps until they died and so would not normally receive a repeat stripe.

Later in the war (late 1944), to save cloth Jewish prisoners wore a yellow bar over a regular point-down triangle to indicate their status. For instance, regular Jews would wear a yellow bar over a red triangle while Jewish criminals would wear a yellow bar over a green triangle.

Special marks 

Many various markings and combinations existed. A prisoner would usually have at least two and possibly more than six.

Limited preventative custody detainee (or BV) was the term for general criminals (who wore green triangles with no special marks). They originally were only supposed to be incarcerated at the camp until their term expired and then they would be released. However, when the war began they were confined indefinitely for its duration.

 (reformatory inmates) wore E or EH in large black letters on a white square. They were made up of intellectuals and respected community members who could organize and lead a resistance movement, suspicious persons picked up in sweeps or stopped at checkpoints, people caught performing conspiratorial activities or acts and inmates who broke work discipline. They were assigned to hard labor for six to eight weeks and were then released. It was hoped that the threat of permanent incarceration at hard labor would deter them from further action.

To save expense, some camps had them just wear their civilian clothes without markings. Records used the letter PSV to designate them. They were people awaiting trial by a police court-martial or who were already convicted. They were detained in a special jail barracks until they were executed.

Some camps assigned  (night and fog) prisoners had them wear two large letters NN in yellow.

They were the few who had not been shot out of hand or died of neglect from untreated wounds, exposure to the elements, or starvation before they could reach a camp. They performed hard labor. Some joined Andrey Vlasov's Liberation Army to fight for the Germans.

Labor education detainees wore a white letter A on their black triangle. They were usually assigned to work at labor camps.

 (anti-socials) inmates wore a plain black triangle. They were considered either too "selfish" or "deviant" to contribute to society or were considered too impaired to support themselves. They were therefore considered a burden. This category included pacifists and conscription resisters, petty or habitual criminals, the mentally ill and the mentally and/or physically disabled. They were usually executed.

The   (punishment battalion) and SS  (probation company) were military punishment units. They wore regular uniforms, but were forbidden rank or unit insignia until they had proven themselves in combat. They wore an uninverted (point-upwards) red triangle on their upper sleeves to indicate their status. Most were used for hard labor, "special tasks" (unwanted dangerous jobs like defusing landmines or running phone cables) or were used as forlorn hopes or cannon fodder. The infamous Dirlewanger Brigade was an example of a regular unit created from such personnel.

A  (punishment company) was a hard labor unit in the camps. Inmates assigned to it wore a black roundel bordered white under their triangle patch.

Prisoners "suspected of [attempting to] escape" wore a red roundel bordered white under their triangle patch. If also assigned to hard labor, they wore the red roundel under their black  roundel.

A prisoner-functionary, or kapo (boss), wore a cloth brassard (their , or identifying mark) to indicate their status. They served as camp guards, barracks clerks and the senior prisoners (meaning elders) at the camp, barracks and room levels of camp organization. They received privileges like bigger and sometimes better food rations, better quarters (or even a private room), luxuries (like tobacco or alcohol) and access to the camp's facilities (like the showers or the pool). Failure to please their captors meant demotion and loss of privileges and an almost certain death at the hands of their fellow inmates.

Detainees wearing civilian clothing (more common later in the war) instead of the striped uniforms were often marked with a prominent X on the back. This made for an ersatz prisoner uniform. For permanence, such Xs were made with white oil paint, with sewn-on cloth strips, or were cut (with underlying jacket-liner fabric providing the contrasting color). Detainees would be compelled to sew their number and (if applicable) a triangle emblem onto the fronts of such X-ed clothing.

Table of camp inmate markings

Postwar use 
Triangle-motifs appear on many postwar memorials to the victims of the Nazis. Most triangles are plain while some others bear nationality-letters. The otherwise potentially puzzling designs are a direct reference to the identification patches used in the camps. On such monuments, typically an inverted (point down, base up) triangle (especially if red) evokes all victims, including also the non-Jewish victims like Slavs, Poles, communists, homosexuals, Roma and Sinti (see Porajmos), people with disability (see Action T4), Soviet POWs and Jehovah's Witnesses.  An inverted triangle colored pink would symbolize gay male victims.  A non-inverted (base down, point up) triangle and/or a yellow triangle is generally more evocative of the Jewish victims.

2020 Trump campaign 

In June 2020, the re-election campaign of Donald Trump posted an advertisement on Facebook stating that "Dangerous MOBS of far-left groups are running through our streets and causing absolute mayhem" and identifying them as "ANTIFA", accompanied by a graphic of a downward-pointing red triangle. The ads appeared on the Facebook pages of Donald Trump, the Trump campaign, and Vice President Mike Pence. Many observers compared the graphic to the symbol used by the Nazis for identifying political prisoners such as communists, social democrats and socialists.  Many noted the number of ads – 88 – which is associated with neo-Nazis and white supremacists.

As an example of the public outcry against the use of the downward-pointing red triangle, as reported by MotherJones, the Twitter account (@jewishaction), the account of Bend the Arc: Jewish Action, a Progressive Jewish site stated:"The President of the United States is campaigning for reelection using a Nazi concentration camp symbol.
Nazis used the red triangle to mark political prisoners and people who rescued Jews.
Trump & the RNC are using it to smear millions of protestors.

Their masks are off. pic.twitter.com/UzmzDaRBup"Facebook removed the campaign ads with the graphic, saying that its use in this context violated their policy against "organized hate". The Trump campaign's communications director wrote that "The red triangle is a common Antifa symbol used in an ad about Antifa." Historian Mark Bray, author of Antifa: The Anti-Fascist Handbook, disputed this, saying that the symbol is not associated with Antifa in the United States.

References 
Informational notes

Citations

Bibliography
 Richard Plant (1988). The Pink Triangle: The Nazi War Against Homosexuals. Owl Books. .
 Camp badge chart at historyplace.com.
 Additional camp badge chart.

External links 

 United States Holocaust Memorial Museum. Classification system in Nazi concentration camps.
 Stars, triangles and markings. Jewish Virtual Library.
 Gay Prisoners in Concentration Camps as Compared with Jehovah's Witnesses and Political Prisoners. Ruediger Lautmann.

Terminology of Nazi concentration camps
Identity documents of Nazi Germany
The Holocaust